Superfluidity is the characteristic property of a fluid with zero viscosity which therefore flows without any loss of kinetic energy. When stirred, a superfluid forms vortices that continue to rotate indefinitely. Superfluidity occurs in two isotopes of helium (helium-3 and helium-4) when they are liquefied by cooling to cryogenic temperatures. It is also a property of various other exotic states of matter theorized to exist in astrophysics, high-energy physics, and theories of quantum gravity. The theory of superfluidity was developed by Soviet theoretical physicists Lev Landau and Isaak Khalatnikov.

Superfluidity is often coincidental with Bose–Einstein condensation, but neither phenomenon is directly related to the other; not all Bose–Einstein condensates can be regarded as superfluids, and not all superfluids are Bose–Einstein condensates.

Superfluidity of liquid helium 

Superfluidity was discovered in helium-4 by Pyotr Kapitsa and independently by John F. Allen and Don Misener in 1937. It has since been described through phenomenology and microscopic theories. In liquid helium-4, the superfluidity occurs at far higher temperatures than it does in helium-3. Each atom of helium-4 is a boson particle, by virtue of its integer spin. A helium-3 atom is a fermion particle; it can form bosons only by pairing with another particle like itself at much lower temperatures. The discovery of superfluidity in helium-3 was the basis for the award of the 1996 Nobel Prize in Physics. This process is similar to the electron pairing in superconductivity.

Ultracold atomic gases 
Superfluidity in an ultracold fermionic gas was experimentally proven by Wolfgang Ketterle and his team who observed quantum vortices in lithium-6 at a temperature of 50 nK at MIT in April 2005.  Such vortices had previously been observed in an ultracold bosonic gas using rubidium-87 in 2000, and more recently in two-dimensional gases. As early as 1999, Lene Hau created such a condensate using sodium atoms for the purpose of slowing light, and later stopping it completely.  Her team subsequently used this system of compressed light to generate the superfluid analogue of shock waves and tornadoes:

Superfluids in astrophysics 
The idea that superfluidity exists inside neutron stars was first proposed by Arkady Migdal. By analogy with electrons inside superconductors forming Cooper pairs because of electron-lattice interaction, it is expected that nucleons in a neutron star at sufficiently high density and low temperature can also form Cooper pairs because of the long-range attractive nuclear force and lead to superfluidity and superconductivity.

In high-energy physics and quantum gravity 

Superfluid vacuum theory (SVT) is an approach in theoretical physics and quantum mechanics where the physical vacuum is viewed as superfluid.

The ultimate goal of the approach is to develop scientific models that unify quantum mechanics (describing three of the four known fundamental interactions) with gravity. This makes SVT a candidate for the theory of quantum gravity and an extension of the Standard Model.

It is hoped that development of such theory would unify into a single consistent model of all fundamental interactions,
and to describe all known interactions and elementary particles as different manifestations of the same entity, superfluid vacuum.

On the macro-scale a larger similar phenomenon has been suggested as happening in the murmurations of starlings. The rapidity of change in flight patterns mimics the phase change leading to superfluidity in some liquid states.

Light behaves like a superfluid in various applications such as Poisson's Spot. As the liquid helium shown above, light will travel along the surface of an obstacle before continuing along its trajectory. Since light is not affected by local gravity its "level" becomes its own trajectory and velocity. Another example is how a beam of light travels through the hole of an aperture and along its backside before diffraction.

See also 
 Boojum (superfluidity)
 Condensed matter physics
 Macroscopic quantum phenomena
 Quantum hydrodynamics
 Slow light
 Superconductivity
 Supersolid

References

Further reading 
 
 
  
 Svistunov, B. V., Babaev E. S., Prokof'ev N. V. Superfluid States of Matter

External links 
 
 
 Video: Demonstration of superfluid helium (Alfred Leitner, 1963, 38 min.)
 Superfluidity seen in a 2d fermi gas recent 2021 observation relevant for Cuprate superconductors

Superfluidity

Physical phenomena
Fluid dynamics
Liquid helium
Phases of matter
Emerging technologies
Lev Landau